Sulejman is the Bosnian and Albanian variant of Suleiman (Arabic ) as a given name and surname. It means "man of peace". It may refer to:

Sulejman Bargjini (also known as Sulejman Pasha), general of the Ottoman Empire 
Sulejman Delvina (1884–1933), Albanian politician and prime minister
Sulejman Halilović (born 1955), Bosnian football (soccer) player
Sulejman Kupusović (1951–2014) was a Bosnian film director 
Sulejman Maliqati (born 1928), Albanian football (soccer) player
Sulejman Medenčević (born 1963), Yugoslavia-born American cinematographer and producer
Sulejman Mema, Albanian football (soccer) player and manager
Sulejman Naibi (Ramazani), Albanian poet 
Sulejman Pačariz (? —1945), Islamic cleric and commander of the detachment of Muslim militia from Hisardžik (Prijepolje, modern-day Serbia)
Sulejman Pitarka (1924–2007), Albanian actor, writer and playwright 
Sulejman Rebac (1929–2006), Bosnian football (soccer) player and manager
Sulejman Smajić, Bosnian football (soccer) player
Sulejman Starova (born 1955), Albanian football (soccer) player 
Sulejman Tihić, Bosniak politician
Sulejman Ugljanin (born 1953), Serbian Bosniak politician
Sulejman Vokshi (1815–1890), Albanian military commander and leader of the League of Prizren
Sulejman Zalla (1892–1966), Albanian teacher, patriot and activist of the Rilindja Kombëtare of the early 20th century
Sulejman Krpić (born 1991), Bosnian football (soccer) player

See also
Suleiman
Sulejman Pasha Tomb
Sulejman Pasha Mosque, Tirana, Albania

Bosniak masculine given names
Bosnian masculine given names